Il nido di falasco is a 1950 Italian melodrama film directed by Guido Brignone.

Cast
Umberto Spadaro
Liliana Tellini
Ermanno Randi
Gaetano Verna
Carlo Lombardi
Pina Piovani
Checco Durante
Maria Zanoli

External links
 

1950 films
1950s Italian-language films
Films directed by Guido Brignone
Italian black-and-white films
Melodrama films
Italian drama films
1950 drama films
1950s Italian films